Thomas Oliver Harding (born 5 January 1850) was Senior Wrangler at Cambridge University in 1873.

Harding was the son of the Reverend Thomas Harding, a Wesleyan minister, of Whitehaven. He received his early education at Kingswood Wesleyan School near Bath, followed by studies at King's College, London, and then at Trinity College, Cambridge where he took the Mathematical Tripos. The College awarded him the senior mathematical minor scholarship, and elected him to a foundation scholarship in 1871. He was a first-class prizeman in 1870, 1871 and 1872, graduating as Senior Wrangler in 1873 and receiving his MA in 1876.

Harding was elected to the Cambridge Apostles in 1872, and as an undergraduate proved a keen oarsman and swimmer. After graduation he became a schoolmaster at Marlborough College, and (according to one source) a barrister.

He died in 1896.

References

Alumni of Trinity College, Cambridge
Senior Wranglers
1850 births
1896 deaths